Gradišče is a small village in the Municipality of Tišina in the Prekmurje region of northeastern Slovenia.

János Kühár (1901–1987), a priest and writer in Prekmurje Slovene active in Vas County, Hungary, and his brother István Kühár, a politician, were born in Gradišče.

References

External links
Gradišče on Geopedia

Populated places in the Municipality of Tišina